Pig-poré is a village in the Poura Department of Balé Province in southern Burkina Faso. The village has a population of 637.

References

Populated places in the Boucle du Mouhoun Region
Balé Province